Myra Breckinridge is a 1968 satirical novel by Gore Vidal written in the form of a diary. Described by the critic Dennis Altman as "part of a major cultural assault on the assumed norms of gender and sexuality which swept the western world in the late 1960s and early 1970s", the book's major themes are  feminism, transsexuality, American expressions of machismo and patriarchy, and deviant sexual practices, as filtered through an aggressively camp sensibility. The controversial book is also "the first instance of a novel in which the main character undergoes a clinical sex-change". Set in Hollywood in the 1960s, the novel also contains candid and irreverent glimpses into the machinations within the film industry.

Myra Breckinridge was dismissed by some of the era's more conservative critics as pornographic at the time of its first publication in February 1968; nevertheless, the novel immediately became a worldwide bestseller and has since come to be considered a classic in some circles. "It is tempting to argue that Vidal said more to subvert the dominant rules of sex and gender in Myra than is contained in a shelf of queer theory treatises", wrote Dennis Altman. Critic Harold Bloom cites the novel as a canonical work in his book The Western Canon. Vidal called Myra the favorite of his books, and published a sequel, Myron, in 1974.

The novel was adapted into a 1970 film of the same name, which was panned. Vidal disowned the film, calling it "an awful joke".

In his 1995 memoir Palimpsest, Vidal said the voice of Myra may have been inspired by the "megalomania" of Anaïs Nin's diaries. Indeed, the story is told through increasingly erratic entries in Myra's own personal diary and recordings on events given by Buck Loner.

Plot
An attractive young woman, Myra Breckinridge is a film buff with a special interest in the Golden Age of Hollywood—in particular the 1940s—and the writings of film critic Parker Tyler. She comes to the Academy for Aspiring Young Actors and Actresses, owned by her deceased husband Myron's uncle, Buck Loner. Here, she gets a job teaching, not just her regular classes (Posture and Empathy), but also, as part of the hidden curriculum, female dominance.

The spirit of the times is reflected in Myra's attendance at an orgy arranged by a student. She intends only to observe but suffers a "rude intrusion" by a member of the band The Four Skins, from which she derives a perverse, masochistic enjoyment. At an earlier regular party, after "mixing gin and marijuana", she eventually gets "stoned out of her head" and has a fit, before passing out in a bathroom.

Still in the process of transitioning from male to female and unable to obtain hormones, Myra transforms into Myron, and, as a result of the injuries she has sustained in a car accident, is forced to have her breast implants removed. Now a eunuch, Myron decides to settle down with Mary-Ann.

Writing
Vidal first contemplated writing Myra Breckinridge as a sketch for the risqué revue Oh! Calcutta! but quickly decided to develop the story into a novel. He wrote the first draft in Rome over the course of a month. About two weeks into writing the novel Vidal decided to make Myra transgender.<ref name=Documentary>As stated by Vidal in the documentary Gore Vidal: The United States of Amnesia</ref>  The name "Breckinridge" was taken from Bunny Breckinridge, an associate of director Ed Wood, and a stage performer whose openly gay, flamboyantly transgressive life partly inspired Vidal's novel.

AnalysisMyra Breckinridge'' explores the mutability of gender-role and sexual-orientation as being social constructs established by social mores. The first novel whose main character undergoes a clinical sex-change, it was praised by Edmund Miller as "a brilliantly chosen image for satire of contemporary mores." Arnie Kantrowitz called the titular character a "comic surrogate [who] looks at life from both sides" and "wields a wicked dildo in her war against gender roles", and Joseph Cady wrote that the novel "skewers conventional American sexuality".

References

1968 American novels
Metafictional novels
Novels by Gore Vidal
Fictional diaries
Literature related to the sexual revolution
American LGBT novels
Hollywood novels
American novels adapted into films
Novels with transgender themes
Little, Brown and Company books
Novels about rape
1960s LGBT novels